The 2007 FIA GT Adria 2 Hours was the seventh round of the 2007 FIA GT Championship season.  It took place at Adria International Raceway, Italy, on September 8, 2007.  This race was run later than usual, under the cover of darkness.  However the track did use floodlights in an attempt to aid the drivers.

Official results
Class winners in bold.  Cars failing to complete 75% of winner's distance marked as Not Classified (NC).  Cars with a C under their class are running in the Citation Cup, with the winner marked in bold italics.

† – #62 Scuderia Ecosse was disqualified for failing to perform its mandatory second pit stop before the end of the race.

Statistics
 Pole Position – #33 JetAlliance Racing – 1:21.051
 Average Speed – 127.28 km/h

References

A
FIA GT Adria